Substation 7 is a traction substation located at 1782 Third Avenue at 99th Street in the East Harlem neighborhood of Manhattan. The Manhattan Railway Company built it in order to electrify the Second, Third and Ninth Avenue elevated lines. It served as a power source for the IRT Lexington Avenue Line from 1918 until the 1970s.  It originally converted 25 Hz AC power from the 74th Street power station, to DC for the electric motors.  The substation is owned by the MTA and it is listed on the National Register of Historic Places.

References 

Buildings and structures on the National Register of Historic Places in Manhattan
East Harlem
Former power stations in New York City
New York City Subway infrastructure
Third Avenue